Nongyenanlu is a metro station of Zhengzhou Metro Line 1.

Station layout 
The station is a two-level underground station with a single island platform. The B1 level is for the station concourse and the B2 level is for the platforms.

Exits

Surroundings
Henan Provincial People's Government (河南省人民政府)
Sheraton Grand Zhengzhou Hotel (郑州美盛喜来登酒店)
Henan Geological Museum (河南省地质博物馆)

References

Stations of Zhengzhou Metro
Line 1, Zhengzhou Metro
Railway stations in China opened in 2013